Chionopsis intrapurpurea, the lady in waiting venus, is a species of marine bivalve in the genus Chionopsis.

Discovery 
The lady in waiting venus was initially described in 1849 by Timothy Abbott Conrad.

References 

Veneridae
Bivalves described in 1849